MSC Oscar, and sister ships MSC Zoe and MSC Oliver, are large container ships. Christened on 8 January 2015, MSC Oscar was recognised as the largest container ship in the world; until then CSCL Globe, inaugurated in November 2014, had been the largest.

Name
MSC Oscar takes her name from the son of Diego Aponte, the  president and chief executive of owner Mediterranean Shipping Company (MSC).

Construction

MSC Oscar was built by Daewoo in South Korea for US$140m.

Number of containers 

The ship was first planned for 18,400 TEU. Upon completion of construction the capacity was 19,224 TEU, including the capacity for 1,800 refrigerated containers. As the deadweight tonnage of the ship is 197,362 DWT, she can only carry a full load of containers if each has a mean weight not exceeding 10.2 tonnes. With average 14-tonne containers, the capacity is around 14,000 TEU.

Propulsion

In the media
MSC Oscar was the subject of an episode of the television program Mighty Ships, the second episode of the tenth series. Produced by a Canadian company, Exploration Production Inc., the program was first telecast in Canada on 10 December 2017. The series is aired in other countries as well.

The ship was featured in the 2018 Semi-Final of Sky Arts Landscape Artist of the Year. The contestants were halfway through their task of painting Felixstowe Docks when the MSC Oscar appeared.

Sister ships
MSC Zoe
MSC Oliver
MSC Maya
MSC Sveva

See also
Largest container shipping companies
Largest container ships ever built

References

External links

On board the world's biggest ship, BBC News.

Container ships
Ships built by Daewoo Shipbuilding & Marine Engineering